Cité Libre was an influential political journal published in Quebec, Canada, through the 1950s and 1960s. Co-founded in 1950 by editor and future Prime Minister of Canada Pierre Trudeau, the publication served as an organ of opposition to the conservative government of Maurice Duplessis.

The journal published contributions by intellectuals such as Trudeau, Gérard Pelletier, René Lévesque, Pierre Vallières and other intellectuals and activists. In doing so, the journal gained a reputation for its radical viewpoints at a time when anti-Duplessis views were difficult to get into print. The journal was anti-clerical and often criticised the strong influence that the Roman Catholic Church then had in Quebec. It also favoured civil liberties, as shown by its opposition to such measures as the Padlock Law (adopted by Duplessis in 1937) and its support of the Asbestos Strike. Editor Trudeau helped form the Rassemblement, a group devoted to turning the public against Duplessis. This group, combined with Cité Libre, helped foster the intellectualism that revived the Quebec Liberal Party, which defeated the Union Nationale in 1960. Many of the themes raised by Cité Libre found fruition during Quebec's Quiet Revolution of the 1960s. A number of the journal's contributors went on to take leading parts in that movement. As the 1960s progressed, Quebec society became divided between Quebec nationalists and sovereigntists such as Lévesque and Vallières and Canadian federalists such as Trudeau and Pelletier. This caused a rift among the journal's board members, ultimately leading to the magazine's evolution into a federalist journal. As well, the journal abandoned its earlier interest in socialist ideas and became more and more liberal in orientation. The division among Quebec's left, as well as the entry of a number of Cité Libre figures into electoral politics, led to the journal's demise in 1966.

Cité Libre was revived in July 1991 to help promote Canadian national unity in Quebec and combat the perceived (pro-Quebec nationalist) "political unanimism" in the province. In this era, the editorship of the magazine was taken over by academics Max Nemni and Monique Nemni. In 1998, an English-language version (also under the name Cité Libre) was launched; unlike most other bilingual publications, both the French and English versions were identical in their respective content.

Publication ceased (both in French and English) in 2000, officially because of the magazine's perception that separatism was defeated.

Cité Libre was further revived in mid-March 2008, in response to what they saw as the destruction of the progressive traditions of the Liberal Party of Canada under the leadership of Stéphane Dion. For the founders, this included Dion's tacit endorsement of the Security and Prosperity Partnership North American Union (SPP-NAU) agenda.

References

External links 
 Encarta: Pierre Trudeau (Archived 2009-10-31)

1950 establishments in Quebec
1966 disestablishments in Quebec
1991 establishments in Quebec
2000 disestablishments in Quebec
Cultural magazines published in Canada
Defunct political magazines published in Canada
French-language magazines published in Canada
Magazines established in 1950
Magazines disestablished in 1966
Magazines established in 1991
Magazines disestablished in 2000
Magazines published in Montreal
Political history of Quebec